Nikolay Andreyevich Cherkasov (born 26 September 1996 in Omsk) is a Russian cyclist, who currently rides for UCI ProTeam .

Major results
2013
 1st  Time trial, UEC European Junior Road Championships
 1st  Time trial, National Junior Road Championships
 1st Stage 3 Tour du Valromey
 1st Stage 2 Aubel-Thimister-La Gleize
2017
 7th Overall Giro della Valle d'Aosta
 9th Overall Giro Ciclistico d'Italia
2019
 3rd Coppa Agostoni
 3rd Giro della Toscana
 4th Overall Tour of Almaty
 6th Overall Tour de Langkawi

References

External links

1996 births
Living people
Russian male cyclists
Sportspeople from Omsk